Aluminoceladonite is a low-temperature potassium dioctahedral mica mineral which is an end-member in the illite-aluminoceladonite solid solution series. The chemical formula for aluminoceladonite is K(Mg,Fe2+)Al(Si4O10)(OH)2.

Occurrence
Aluminoceladonite is often referred to as a rare mineral, though its actual abundance may be underestimated due to difficulty of identification. Aluminoceladonite, along with other phyllosilicate minerals in the illite-aluminoceladonite solid solution series, has been observed mainly among finely dispersed, mostly inter-layer-deficient, aluminum-rich potassium-dioctahedral mica varieties occurring in sedimentary rocks.

References

Potassium minerals
Mica group
Monoclinic minerals
Minerals in space group 12
Aluminium minerals
Magnesium minerals